Bobby Brown (born June 5, 1991) is an American freeskier specializing in slopestyle and big air competitions.

Brown was the first to execute multiple variations of a triple flip or triple cork at a training session in Squaw Valley, California.  He gained notoriety after winning both the SlopeStyle and Big Air events at Winter X Games XIV, registering a perfect score of 100 in the latter.  Brown was the first person ever to have landed a Switch Double Misty 1440. He was one of the first skiers ever to have landed a Triple Cork 1440.

Bobby is known for his tricks in the air, He has successfully landed many triple corks. Brown had a web show called "Bobby's Life", which features his life, friends, and skiing.  In addition, Brown was the first skier to win two gold medals in the same Winter X Games.

Bobby Brown is a Red Bull Athlete.

Competitions
 7th place Jon Olsson Invitational
 09-10 Dew Tours
 2009: 4th at Breckenridge Totino's Open
 2010: 3rd at Snowbasin Wendy's Invitational
 2010: 1st at Mount Snow Toyota Challenge
 Dew Tour:
 2010: 2nd in year-end Dew Cup standings
 2009: 3rd in year-end Dew Cup standings
 2011: Overall dew cup champion
 Other Competitions
 2010: 1st at Sweet Rumble Big Air
 2010: 1st at Toyota's One Hit Wonder Down Under
 2010: 1st at Slopestyle Junior World Championships (New Zealand)
 2010: ESPY's Best Male Action Sports Athlete Nominee
 2010: 2nd at Winter X Games Europe Slopestyle
 2010: 1st at Winter X Games Big Air
 2010: 1st at Winter X Games Slopestyle
 2010: 1st at 100% NZ Winter Games Big Air
 2009: 6th at Winter X Games
 2009: 2nd in London Freeze Big Air
 2008: 1st in Big Bear Open Slopestyle
 2008: 4th in North American Open Slopestyle
 2011: 2nd in Winter x Games Big air
 2012: 1st in Winter X Games Big air
 2012: 2nd at Sammy Carlson invitational
 2015: Winter X Games Silver-Big Air
 2014: 2nd place World Ski and Snowboard Festival-Big Air & Slopestyle
 2014: 2nd place 2014 AFP Ranking-Slopestyle
 2014: 1st place 2014 Breckenridge Grand Prix
 2012: Winter X Games Gold-Big Air
 2012: Winter X Games Tignes Gold-Slopestyle,
 2011: 1st Overall in 2011 Dew Tour Year End Rankings-Slopestyle
 2010: 1st Overall in 2010 AFP Year End Rankings-Slopestyle
 2010: US Olympic Freeski Team Member (inaugural event in Sochi, Russia)

Personal

Brown is the son of Bob and Connie. He has a sister, Grace, and brother, Peter. He attended Cherry Creek High School in Colorado.

Brown became engaged to long-time girlfriend, Nikki Gallen, on January 26, 2017.

References

External links
 
 
 
 
 http://www.killington.com/winter/activities/dew_tour/athletes/1118550283

American freeskiers
Living people
1991 births
X Games athletes
Freestyle skiers at the 2014 Winter Olympics
Olympic freestyle skiers of the United States
Sportspeople from Colorado
American male freestyle skiers